John Frederick Hencken (born May 29, 1954) is an American former competition swimmer, three-time Olympic champion, and former world record-holder.  Hencken won five Olympic medals during his career, including three golds.

Olympic career
At the 1972 Summer Olympics in Munich, Germany, he won a gold medal in the 200-meter breaststroke and a bronze medal in the 100-meter breaststroke.  Four years later at the 1976 Summer Olympics in Montreal, Canada, Hencken won gold medals in the 100-meter breaststroke and 4×100-meter medley relay, and a silver in the 200-meter breaststroke.

During his career Hencken set 21 American and 13 world records. He graduated from Stanford in general engineering and product design, and completed his MBA at the University of Phoenix.

1972 graduate of Cupertino High School, Cupertino, CA

See also
 List of members of the International Swimming Hall of Fame
 List of multiple Olympic gold medalists
 List of Olympic medalists in swimming (men)
 List of Stanford University people
 List of World Aquatics Championships medalists in swimming (men)
 World record progression 100 metres breaststroke
 World record progression 200 metres breaststroke
 World record progression 4 × 100 metres medley relay

References

External links

 
 

1954 births
Living people
American male breaststroke swimmers
World record setters in swimming
Olympic gold medalists for the United States in swimming
People from Culver City, California
Sportspeople from Los Angeles County, California
Stanford Cardinal men's swimmers
Swimmers at the 1972 Summer Olympics
Swimmers at the 1976 Summer Olympics
World Aquatics Championships medalists in swimming
Medalists at the 1976 Summer Olympics
Medalists at the 1972 Summer Olympics
Olympic silver medalists for the United States in swimming
Olympic bronze medalists for the United States in swimming
20th-century American people